The 1957 Italian Grand Prix was a Formula One motor race held on 8 September 1957 at Monza. It was the eighth and final race in the 1957 World Championship of Drivers.

Classification

Qualifying

Race

Notes
 – 1 point for fastest lap

Shared drives
 Car #8: Giorgio Scarlatti (50 laps) and Harry Schell (34 laps). They shared the 2 points for fifth place.
 Car #28: André Simon (40 laps) and Ottorino Volonterio (32 laps).

Championship standings after the race 
Drivers' Championship standings

Note: Only the top five positions are included. Only the best 5 results counted towards the Championship. Numbers without parentheses are Championship points; numbers in parentheses are total points scored.

References

Italian Grand Prix
Italian Grand Prix
Grand Prix